Lenka Dlhopolcová (born 14 July 1984, in Zvolen) is a former Slovak tennis player.

Dlhopolcová, who won three ITF singles titles in her career, reached a ranking high of world No. 156 on 4 February 2002.

She qualified for the first round of the 2001 US Open, but lost 2–6, 3–6 to the eventual champion Venus Williams.

ITF finals (3–7)

Singles (3–2)

Doubles (0–5)

References

External links
 
 

1984 births
Living people
Sportspeople from Zvolen
Slovak female tennis players
21st-century Slovak women